Allen S. Matthews (October 19, 1845 – September 14, 1915) was an American merchant and politician from New York.

Life 
Matthews was born on October 19, 1845 in Vermont. He attended Fort Covington Academy and Eastman Business College. He came to live in Fort Covington, New York, where he worked as a hardware merchant. He served as town supervisor for three years.

In 1891, while running for the New York State Assembly, Matthews was accused of burning his storehouse when it was practically empty and then attempting to collect insurance money for a large amount of wool he claimed was in the storehouse. The charges were disproved and he won the election to the Assembly. He represented Franklin County as a Republican, and served in the Assembly in 1892, 1893, and 1894.

Matthews died at home on September 14, 1915. He was buried in Elmwood Cemetery.

References

External links 

 The Political Graveyard
 Allen S. Matthews at Find a Grave

Eastman Business College alumni
People from Fort Covington, New York
Town supervisors in New York (state)
19th-century American politicians
Republican Party members of the New York State Assembly
Burials in New York (state)
American merchants
1845 births
1915 deaths
19th-century American businesspeople